Cloud Constellation Corporation's is a company aiming to provide a space-based network and cloud data storage service, name SpaceBelt. It has plans for a constellation of 8 satellites able to offer 5 petabytes of data storage and using laser communication links between satellites to transmit data between different locations on Earth.'' 

In 2016 the organization entered into an agreement with SolarCoin solar energy cryptocurrency to store its blockchain vault on the satellites for space-based deep cold storage concurrent with live transactions.

In September 2017 Cloud Constellation entered into an agreement with Virgin Orbit through its LauncherOne program to deploy twelve of its cloud constellation satellites to low Earth orbit. In 2018, service availability was planned for 2021.

See also 
 Cloud storage

References

External links 
 SpaceBelt

Computer storage companies